The Hotter'N Hell Hundred is an annual bicycle ride  in Wichita Falls, Texas.  It is held each year on the 4th or 5th Saturday in August (always nine days before Labor Day) and includes professional as well as amateur riders.  The professional racers ride a 100-mile road race, as well as time trials and criterium. For the amateur riders, there are road routes of 100 mi, 100 km, 50 mi, 25 mi, and 10 km.  The amateur routes are also open for inline skating. Approximately 10,000 to 14,000 riders participate each year, making the Hotter'N Hell Hundred the largest sanctioned century bicycle ride in the U.S. 2009's Hotter'N Hell had over 14,000 riders.

The race was first held in 1982 as part of the Wichita Falls Centennial Celebration. The name is thus a rare example of a triple entendre: one hundred miles (i.e., century) in one hundred degree Fahrenheit weather (the race is held in August, where temperatures in Wichita Falls frequently reach and exceed this level by noon), initially conducted to celebrate the city's 100th anniversary.

The race begins at 7:05 am. Participants in the 100 mile route must reach "Hell's Gate" at the 60 mile mark no later than 12:30 pm or else cannot qualify to finish the 100 mile segment, instead doing a shorter route. Averaging 20 miles an hour it is possible to complete the ride in five hours or less for well-prepared athletes, however most complete in six to nine hours.

Additional events are held throughout the weekend including mountain bike races.

External links
Official site

Bicycle tours
Cycle races in the United States
Sports in Wichita Falls, Texas
Recurring sporting events established in 1982
1982 establishments in Texas
Road bicycle races
Tourist attractions in Wichita County, Texas